The International Journal of Science and Mathematics Education is a bimonthly peer-reviewed academic journal published by Springer Science+Business Media on behalf of the National Science Council of Taiwan. It covers science and mathematics education topics and research methods, particularly ones with cross-curricular dimensions or which explore the area from different cultural perspectives. The journal was established in 2004 with Fou-Lai Lin (National Taiwan Normal University). The current editor-in-chief is Hsin-Kai Wu (National Taiwan Normal University).

Abstracting and indexing 
The journal is abstracted and indexed in:

According to the Journal Citation Reports, the journal has a 2020 impact factor of 2.073.

References

External links 
 

Bimonthly journals
Publications established in 2004
English-language journals
Science education journals
Springer Science+Business Media academic journals
Mathematics education journals